Ronald Cove-Smith (26 November 1899  – 9 March 1988) was an physician and sportsman. He represented Old Merchant Taylors and King's College Hospital RFC. Internationally he represented the England national rugby union team in 29 tests (1921–1929) (seven as captain) and also captained the British Isles in four tests on the 1924 British Lions tour to South Africa as a lock. He finished on the winning side in 22 of his 29 England matches. He was commissioned in the Grenadier Guards in 1918–1919. In addition to rugby he excelled at swimming and water-polo, winning half-blues in each.

Rugby career
Cove-Smith was a talented schoolboy player at Merchant Taylors School, and carried that talent through to university, playing in three Varsity Matches for Cambridge University from 1919 to 1921, winning his sporting 'Blue'. He led the 1924 British Lions tour to South Africa, losing three of the four tests and drawing one. As captain, he led England to the 1928 Grand Slam and he was inducted onto the World Rugby Museum Wall of Fame in 2001.

He also led a distinguished medical career and served as a vice-president of the British Medical Association.

Personal life
In 1933, he married Florence Margaret Harris. Together, they had three children: Rona Cove-Smith (now Blythe), Penelope Cove-Smith (now Newell-Price) and John Rodney Cove-Smith. Penelope and Rodney followed in their father's footsteps by reading medicine and Rona followed her mother in becoming a nurse, later co-authoring Guidelines for Clinical Nursing Practices: Related to a Nursing Model.

References

External links
 The English Rugby Museum
 England Rugby Photo Store
 The England Rugby Wall of Fame
 International Rugby Career
 The Royal College of Physicians

1899 births
1988 deaths
20th-century English medical doctors
Alumni of Gonville and Caius College, Cambridge
British & Irish Lions rugby union players from England
Cambridge University R.U.F.C. players
England international rugby union players
English rugby union players
Middlesex County RFU players
People educated at Merchant Taylors' School, Northwood
Rugby union locks
Rugby union players from Edmonton, London